Taylor Rapp (born December 22, 1997) is an American football safety who is a free agent. He played college football at Washington, and was selected by the Rams in the second round of the 2019 NFL Draft.

Early years
Rapp was born in Atlanta, Georgia, to a Chinese mother from Shanghai and a Caucasian father from Canada. After his birth, his parents decided to move to the West Coast. He was raised in Bellingham, Washington, with his older brother of three years, Austin. NFL.com described Rapp as a player who has "beaten long odds, undeterred by a city that failed to support prep football, a high school community that openly mocked him, coaches who were unprepared to develop his talents, college recruiters who blatantly overlooked him and kids who racially taunted him for his Chinese ethnicity."

Rapp attended Sehome High School in Bellingham, Washington. He played safety and running back and also ran track. Due to his success, he played football for the U-16 and U-17 USA national teams. He committed to Washington in the spring of his junior year, choosing the Huskies over several FBS programs, including Oregon, Stanford, Nebraska, and Notre Dame. 
Rapp was ranked as the #1 safety prospect in the state of Washington and the 9th best safety on the West Coast by Scout.com. He received an invitation to play in the prestigious U.S. Army All-American Bowl game, but elected not to attend as it interfered with his schedule following his early enrollment at the University of Washington.

College career

Freshman
Rapp enrolled early at UW in January 2016 and participated in winter workouts and spring practices. He saw playing time in all 14 games of his freshman season, starting 10 of them. He started to emerge as a play maker in the secondary late in the season after nabbing a pair of interceptions against USC. In the 2016 Pac-12 Football Championship Game, Rapp intercepted back-to-back passes from Colorado QB Sefo Liufau, returning one of them for a touchdown. For his outstanding performance, he was named the Pac-12 Championship Game MVP. Following the regular season, Rapp was named to the USA Today Freshman All-America team. Rapp was recognized by the Pac-12 as the conference's Freshman Defensive Player of the Year. On December 12, Rapp was named to the ESPN True Freshman All-America team. On December 19, he was named to the Pro Football Focus Freshman All-American team. On January 9, Rapp was named to the Football Writers Association of America Freshman All-America team.

Sophomore
Prior to the 2017 season, Rapp was named one of the 100 best players in college football by Sports Illustrated, coming in at number 39 on the list. Earning first-team All-Pac-12 honors for the 2017 season, he was also named to the Academic All-Pac-12 first team. He was also named a CoSIDA Academic All-District 8 player. Rapp gained acceptance into the University of Washington's prestigious Foster School of Business late in 2017.

Junior
Prior to his junior season, Rapp was named a first-team All-American by the Associated Press and Sports Illustrated.  On January 2, 2019, Rapp announced that he would forgo his final year of eligibility and declare for the 2019 NFL Draft.

Professional career

The Los Angeles Rams selected Rapp in the second round (61st overall) of the 2019 NFL Draft. He was the fifth safety drafted in 2019.

2019

On June 7, 2019, the Los Angeles Rams signed Rapp to a four-year, $4.67 million contract that includes $2.12 million guaranteed and a signing bonus of $1.41 million.

In Week 13 against the Arizona Cardinals, Rapp recorded an interception off fellow rookie Kyler Murray and returned it for a 31-yard touchdown in the 34–7 win. This was Rapp's first career interception and touchdown in the NFL. In Week 16 against the San Francisco 49ers, Rapp recorded 5 tackles in the 34–31 loss. With 58 seconds left in the game on third and 16, Rapp made an error in coverage which resulted in a 46-yard completion to wide receiver Emmanuel Sanders, which eventually led to a game-winning field goal that knocked the Rams out of playoff contention. In Week 17 against the Arizona Cardinals, Rapp recovered a fumble lost by Kyler Murray and intercepted another pass thrown by Murray in the 31–24 win.

2020

In Week 7 against the Chicago Bears on Monday Night Football, Rapp recorded his first interception of the season off a pass thrown by Nick Foles during the 24–10 win.
In Week 8 against the Miami Dolphins, Rapp forced a fumble on running back and former college teammate Myles Gaskin which was recovered by the Rams during the 28–17 loss. He suffered a knee injury in Week 10 and was placed on injured reserve on November 17, 2020.

2021

In Week 6, Rapp recorded two interceptions, three passes defensed and five tackles in a 38-11 win over the New York Giants, earning NFC Defensive Player of the Week.
In Week 10 against the San Francisco 49ers on Monday Night Football, Rapp recorded 10 tackles and got his first full career sack on Jimmy Garoppolo during the 31-10 loss. He suffered a concussion in Week 17 against the San Francisco 49ers which caused him to miss the first three playoff games. He won his first Super Bowl title, in which he had seven total tackles, when the Rams beat the Cincinnati Bengals in Super Bowl LVI.

NFL career statistics

Regular season

Postseason

Personal life 
Rapp is engaged to Dani Johnson. He proposed to her following his Super Bowl LVI win with the Rams.

References

External links

Washington Huskies bio
 Los Angeles Rams bio

1997 births
Living people
American football safeties
American sportspeople of Canadian descent
American people of German descent
American sportspeople of Chinese descent
Los Angeles Rams players
Players of American football from Washington (state)
Sportspeople from Bellingham, Washington
Washington Huskies football players